Digby George "Dig" Richards (12 September 194017 February 1983) was an Australian rock and roll singer, songwriter, instrumentalist, musical theatre actor and television presenter, active during the late 1950s and early 1960s as lead singer with the R'Jays. Richards was the first Australian rock and roll artist to record a 12" LP record in Australia, with the self-titled album Dig Richards, released in November 1959. From 1971 he performed as a solo country music artist. According to the Kent Music Report he had four Top 30 national hit singles, "(My) Little Lover" / "Quarrels (Are a Sad Sad Thing)" (September 1960), "A Little Piece of Peace" (June 1971), "People Call Me Country" / "The Dancer" (February 1972), and "Do the Spunky Monkey" (June 1974). On 17 February 1983 Digby Richards died of pancreatic cancer, aged 42. He was survived by his wife, Sue and two children.

Biography
Digby George Richards was born on 12 September 1940 in the rural central western New South Wales town of Dunedoo. His father, Gordon Forrest Richards, was a rural-based policeman, and his mother was Mona, (née Dennis). His younger brother is Douglas Ryman Richards (born ca. 1944). Gordon was later an oyster farmer in Narooma. Richards attended Narooma Central and Moruya High schools, where he completed his Leaving Certificate. At the age of 17 he travelled to Sydney to work in a large department store.

In August 1958, during a chance meeting at the Nock and Kirbys record bar with already established R'Jays band foundation members, drummer Barry Lewis and guitarist Jon Hayton, Richards was offered the spot, untested, as The R'Jays lead singer. This meeting was fortuitous for all, as the band had already booked a venue for a dance night in two weeks time and unfortunately their then singer had turned out to be somewhat average and had departed the scene. Band practice with Richards started the very next night, he did not disappoint.

The R'Jays played their first dance in August 1958 at Castlecraig Community Hall, with a line-up of Richards, Jon Hayton on lead guitar,  Barry Lewis on drums, Ken Conyard on rhythm guitar, Peter Marris on saxophone, and Roger Palfreyman on tea chest bass. They auditioned with Festival Records in 1959 and were the third rock and roll act to be signed to a recording contract; the previous two were Johnny O'Keefe, and Col Joye and the Joy Boys.

During an impromptu chat at channel 9 between TV presenter Brian Henderson and R'Jays band members Barry Lewis and Roger Palfreyman, Henderson took a chance and invited the R'Jays to perform live on "Australian Bandstand". Just one week later, the R'Jays became the first band in Australia to play live on a TV pop music show, Bandstand, and became one of the regular performers. They were also regulars on rival TV show, Six O'Clock Rock. From August 1959 they were the house band on music TV show, Teen Time, which ran on Sydney's ATN-7 until about 1962. In mid-October 1959 they were due to support United States singer, Fabian, on his tour of Australia. However, Richards was hospitalised after a car accident and was unable to tour for months.

By July 1959 the band had become "Dig Richards and the R'Jays". They released their first single, "I Wanna Love You", which was written by Richards' 15-year-old brother, Douglas. It peaked at No. 8 on the local radio station, 2UE's Top 40 records chart. By that time the line-up was Richards, Hayton, and Lewis with Jay Boogie on piano and Peter Baker on electric bass. The group's second single, "I'm Through", also written by Doug, followed in September and reached the Top 40.

Richards became the first Australian rock and roll artist to record a 12" LP record when Dig Richards was released in November 1959. Johnny O'Keefe - Johnny's Golden Album album art	
Johnny O'Keefe And The Dee Jays - Johnny's Golden Album 
3 versions	Festival Records		1958Australian Women's Weeklys entertainment reporter, Ainslie Baker, felt it had "tunes nicely judged to show off the paces of this young rocker". Richards was backed on most tracks by the R'Jays but on four tracks he used The New Notes. In January 1960 Richards supported a tour by US rocker, Billy "Crash" Craddock, promoted by Lee Gordon. Also that month Richards and the R'Jays issued a single, "(Real Gone) Annie Laurie", on Festival Records' label, Rex. Leon Isackson replaced Lewis on drums in 1959. The group, with Richards, issued three further singles on Rex. In September 1960 they supported visiting US singer-actor, Ricky Nelson. Richards' second solo album, Bad Boy, appeared in November. In the studio, for different tracks, he was backed by the R'Jays, The Crescents, or The Graduates. Richards also released solo singles, "You Gotta Love Me" in December 1960, and "Alice (In Wonderland)", which reached No. 33 in June 1961.

After 1962 Richards became a solo performer and taught himself to play guitar. In August he released an extended play, Dig Richards Gets out of the Groove, with guitar supplied by Douglas. Also that month he formed a commercial venture, All Star Promotions, with fellow pop artists Rob E. G. and Johnny Devlin, which ran teenage dance venues. Richards then undertook two review show tours with Ted Quig to "gain more experience in stage work and comedy sketches". His next single, "Raincoat in the River", reached No. 19 in October 1962. He had a four-week tour of rural areas working as a comedy singing duo with Clarence "Buster" Noble, where "One of the things he taught me was facial expression". In December Richards took the lead role in the musical theatre production of Melody Fair at the Elizabethan Theatre, Sydney. He followed with singing and dancing lessons.

In May 1963 he issued another single, "The Love Express", which Baker noted had "a perky girl chorus, train sounds, and the come-hither note in Dig's voice make [it] a train not to be missed, and there's plenty of intimate appeal in the other song ["The Whole Wide World"] – which Dig wrote himself". It was followed in December with "Comin' Down". In December he had a role, Dig the Beatnik, in Once Upon a Surfie, a surf musical farce at the Palace Theatre, Sydney. Also in the musical were Bryan Davies, Rob E. G., Jay Justin, Lucky Starr and Jacki Weaver.

Richards' next four singles for Festival were "Come on and Dance with Me" (May 1964), "Mary from the Dairy" (December), "Puff (The Tragic Wagon)" (June 1965) and "I was Yesterday's Hero, Today I'm a Broken Hearted Clown". From October 1964 to January 1965 Richards compered a weekly children's TV general knowledge quiz show, Ampol Stamp Quiz, with co-host and fellow pop singer Little Pattie. He then worked on the club circuit and in 1966 he toured South East Asia and performed for Australian troops in Vietnam. During 1970 he relocated to the United Kingdom to work the club circuit there.

He returned to Australia in 1971 and, as Digby Richards, continued performing and recording with a mainly country style. That year his next album, Harlequin, appeared on RCA. It provided four singles, "A Little Piece of Peace" (June 1971) No. 28, "Just Loving You" (September), "People Call Me Country" (February 1972) No. 24, and "Dirty River" (May). In 1973 he travelled to Los Angeles where he recorded his next album, Digby Richards (February 1974). Four singles were issued from the album, "If I Could Write a Love Song" (December 1973), "New York City (Send My Baby Home)" (No. 35, April 1974), "Do the Spunky Monkey" (No. 21, June) and "Be My Day" (September).

Richards next album, Collection (1975) provided three singles, "Mr Hard Times" (January 1975), "Little Suzuki" (May) and a re-recorded version of "Raincoat in the River" (August). By 1977 Richards had relocated to the UK again. His 1978 album, Whiskey Sundown, appeared in December and from late that year into the next year he toured Europe as the support act for Dolly Parton, including shows in London. His next album, The Thing is ...?, appeared in January 1981 and was followed by If You Could Read My Mind in December the following year. On 17 February 1983 Digby Richards died of pancreatic cancer, aged 42.

Personal life
In mid-October 1959 Richards was seriously injured in a car accident on the approaches to Sydney Harbour Bridge. He was hospitalised for three weeks with a dislocated hip, and received 15 stitches to his face. In November that year doctors were "pleased with [his] progress ... with no more than a two-inch facial scar".

On 10 July 1964 Richards married telephonist Susan Margaret Clark (born c. 1943). They had started dating after his car accident. By January 1975 the couple had two children, Tim and Jenny. In April 1982 he was diagnosed with pancreatic cancer and on 17 February 1983 he died at the aged of 42.

Discography

Albums
 Dig Richards (Festival, 1959)
 Bad Boy (Rex/Festival, 1960)
 Harlequin (RCA, 1971)
 Digby Richards (RCA, 1974)- AUS #28
 Collection (RCA, 1975)
 The Best of Digby Richards (compilation, RCA, 1977)
 Whiskey Sundown (RCA, 1978)
(RCA, 1981)
 If You Could Read My Mind (EMI, 1982)
 Rock and Roll I Gave You All the Best Years of My Life (compilation, Starcall/Festival, 1984)
 Jive After Five: The Festival File Volume Two (compilation, Festival, 1988)

Extended plays
 Dig Richards Sings Ain't She Sweet (Rex/Festival, 1960)
 At the Melbourne Town Hall (Rex/Festival, 1960)
 Dig's Big 4 (Rex/Festival, 1960)
 You Gotta Love Me (Festival, 1961)
 Dig Richards Gets out of the Groove (Festival, August 1962)
 Raincoat in the River (Festival, 1962)
 The Love Express (Festival, 1963)
 Alison–Digby (Split EP two tracks by Alison McCallum; two tracks, "A Little Piece of Peace" and "People Call Me Country", by Richards; February 1972)

Singles

Awards

Mo Awards
The Australian Entertainment Mo Awards (commonly known informally as the Mo Awards), were annual Australian entertainment industry awards. They recognise achievements in live entertainment in Australia from 1975 to 2016.
 (wins only)
|-
| 1982
| Digby Richards
| Country Male of the Year
|

References

General

  Note: Archived [on-line] copy has limited functionality.
Specific

External links

 Photos:
 "Dig Richards" photo in The Australian Women's Weekly, 23 December 1959, archived by National Library of Australia
 "Digby Richards, Central Coast Leagues Club, Gosford, September 1975" photo, Gostalgia: local history from Gosford Library

1940 births
1983 deaths
Male actors from New South Wales
Australian country singers
Australian pop singers
Australian television presenters
Deaths from pancreatic cancer
Musicians from New South Wales
Deaths from cancer in New South Wales
20th-century Australian male actors
Australian rock guitarists
20th-century guitarists
20th-century Australian male singers
Australian male guitarists